SM U-109 was a Type U 93 submarine of the Imperial German Navy in World War I, taking part in the First Battle of the Atlantic. The building contract was confirmed 5 May 1916, and was awarded to Germaniawerft, Kiel. A Type 93 boat, she was launched 25 September 1917 and commissioned 7 November. She was under the command of Otto Ney. On 28 January 1918, she was sunk  in the English Channel, possibly by a mine, while diving to avoid ships from the Dover Patrol (particularly drifter H.M. Beryl III). She sank no ships.

Design
German Type U 93 submarines were preceded by the shorter Type U 87 submarines. U-109 had a displacement of  when at the surface and  while submerged. The submarine was powered by two  engines for use while surfaced, and two  engines for use while submerged. She had two propeller shafts and two  propellers.

U-109 was fitted with six  torpedo tubes (four at the bow and two at the stern), twelve to sixteen torpedoes, one  SK L/45 deck gun, and one  SK L/30 deck gun. She had a complement of thirty-six (thirty-two crew members and four officers).

References

Notes

Citations

Bibliography

World War I submarines of Germany
German Type U 93 submarines
Ships built in Kiel
1917 ships
U-boats commissioned in 1917
World War I shipwrecks in the English Channel
U-boats sunk in 1918
Ships lost with all hands
Maritime incidents in 1918